John L. Clendenin was the chairman of The Home Depot. He was also a director of the company Powerwave Technologies, which ceased operations in 2013. In 2009, Powerwave Technologies paid Clendenin a total director compensation of $93,989. On October 29, 2012, Clendenin notified the Board of Directors of Powerwave  that he is retiring from the Board of the Company effective December 17, 2012.

Awards 
In 1992, Clendenin was awarded the Silver Buffalo Award of the Boy Scouts of America. He served as National President of the Boy Scouts of America between 1992-1994.

In 2004, Clendenin won the Outstanding Directors Program Award as a director and Chairman of Home Depot, Inc.

References

External links

1934 births
Living people
The Home Depot people
People from El Paso, Texas
Businesspeople from Texas
Presidents of the Boy Scouts of America